Stink is an EP by the band The Replacements, recorded at Blackberry Way, Minneapolis, Minnesota, on March 13, 1982, and released on June 24, 1982.

Before the first track, "Kids Don't Follow", audio can be heard of the Minneapolis police breaking up a rent party at The Harmony Building in Minneapolis. It is possible by listening carefully to hear one of the audience members curse the police. The audience member in question is believed to be Dave Pirner of Soul Asylum.

The EP was remastered and reissued by Rhino Entertainment on April 22, 2008, with four additional tracks and liner notes by Peter Jesperson.

The song "Kids Don't Follow" was made available as Rock Band 2 DLC on May 19, 2009.

Track listing

Personnel
The Replacements
Paul Westerberg - vocals, rhythm guitar, harmonica 
Bob Stinson - lead guitar
Tommy Stinson - bass guitar
Chris Mars - drums
Technical
Peter Jesperson - producer, mixer
Steven Fjelstad - producer, engineer
Erik Hanson - photography
Bruce Allen - artwork

References

https://blog.thecurrent.org/2016/01/the-replacements-stink-show-a-true-story-from-minnesota-music-history/

The Replacements (band) EPs
1982 EPs
Rhino Entertainment albums
Twin/Tone Records EPs